Monte Raymond (born 18 November 1973) is a retired Canadian athlete who specialised in the 400 metres hurdles. He represented his country at the 1999 and 2001 World Championships.

His personal best in the event is 49.64 seconds set in Flagstaff in 1999.

Competition record

References

External links
 
 
 

1973 births
Living people
Canadian male hurdlers
Commonwealth Games competitors for Canada
Athletes (track and field) at the 1994 Commonwealth Games
Athletes (track and field) at the 1998 Commonwealth Games
Pan American Games track and field athletes for Canada
Athletes (track and field) at the 1999 Pan American Games
World Athletics Championships athletes for Canada